The men's 4 x 400 metres relay at the 2007 World Championships in Athletics was held at the Nagai Stadium on 1 and 2 September.

Medalists

* Runners who participated in the heats only and received medals.

Records

Prior to the competition, the following records were as follows.

Schedule

Results

Heats

Qualification: First 3 of each heat (Q) plus the 2 fastest times (q) advance to the final.

Final

References
Results

Relay 4x400
Relays at the World Athletics Championships